George M. Lane (October 15, 1928 – June 7, 2016) was a career U.S. Foreign Service Officer and was the U.S. Ambassador to Yemen (1978–1981). Lane entered the Foreign Service in 1957 and served as an international relations officer at the State Department.

Early life and education 
Lane was born 15 October 1928, in Baltimore, Md. Lane served in the U.S. Army from 1951 to 1954. He was Deputy Director, then Acting Director of the Office of North African Affairs at the State Department.

Career 

 Officer at the State Department (1970–1972)
 International relations officer (1972–1973)
 Acting Director of the Office of North African Affairs at the State Department (1973–1974)
 Deputy Chief of Mission in Mbabane (1974–1976)
 Deputy Chief of Mission in Beirut (1976)
 U.S. Ambassador to Yemen (1978–1981)

References 

1928 births
Ambassadors of the United States to North Yemen
Cornell University alumni
2016 deaths